The Gold Coast Suns is a professional Australian rules football club that competes in the Australian Football League (AFL). The club is based on Queensland's  Gold Coast in the suburb of Carrara.

The club has been playing in the AFL since the 2011 season, having been founded as the league's 17th active club by a consortium formerly known as "GC17" and being granted a licence to join the AFL on 31 March 2009. The team play home matches at Carrara Stadium (known for commercial purposes as "Metricon Stadium") and have their training and administrative facilities located at the adjacent Gold Coast Sports and Leisure Centre. The club is one of two AFL clubs based in Queensland, the other being its main rival, the Brisbane Lions. The Suns also field teams in the AFL Women's competition and the Victorian Football League.

History

Foundation
The first application for a license by a Gold Coast team to enter the AFL was made in 1996 by the wealthy and popular Gold Coast based Southport Sharks club (formed 1961), with an excess of 20,000 members, the on-field QAFL powerhouse made a formal bid to the AFL. However, the AFL declined the license in favour of admitting the Port Adelaide Football Club. There was strong opposition from the majority of the QAFL clubs and supporters, and the AFL felt that the popular Sharks brand, and its reliance on gaming and hospitality revenue, could divide rather than unite the Gold Coast community. In 2006, the AFLattempted to negotiate a merger between the Sharks and a Melbourne based club. The AFL made the Gold Coast a primary target for a proposed relocation of the North Melbourne Football Club which had sold some of its home games there. The league pushed for a merger with the Sharks offering significant financial incentives, however North Melbourne blocked the move and the AFL decided that a new license would be the best avenue for moving forward. On 24 December 2007, the AFL obtained Australian Securities and Investments Commission (ASIC) registration for the name "Gold Coast Football Club Ltd". In March 2008 the AFL won the support of the league's 16 club presidents to establish sides on the Gold Coast and in Western Sydney. Shortly thereafter the AFL invited the Sharks to become part of a consortium, and the club made a $150,000 donation and sought to meet the strict criteria set down for inclusion by the AFL. As part of the winning bid, the Sharks contributed $10 million in corporate sponsorship. However the AFL officially ruled out use of the Sharks nickname (along with other nominations including the Dolphins and Pirates) for the new club, despite them being the highest polling choices of AFL supporters. The club's identity was put to a public nomination and voting process with the Marlins and Stingrays being the most popular of the available options among community stakeholders. In response to the poll, however the AFL announced that it would not adopt any of the community suggested names and the team would initially remain unnamed and that the nickname would evolve. However it was later leaked that the AFL's marketing department had already chosen the Suns brand independent of the community consultation.

The new club was formally granted the license to compete in the AFL on 31 March 2009.

AFL CEO Andrew Demetriou announced the club could debut in the Queensland State League in 2009 as it recruited players and prepared for its debut season in the AFL, which the league scheduled for 2011. Marquee AFL players such as Nick Riewoldt, Lance Franklin and Kurt Tippett were speculated as potential signings for Gold Coast, though all three men ended up re-signing with their existing clubs. In June 2008 it was announced that the new team would play in the TAC Cup in 2009 and the Victorian Football League in 2010 ahead of its entry into the AFL in 2011. Later that year the board of business-people who had been appointed to set up the club, and were known as the GC17 bid, appointed WAFL coach and former  player Guy McKenna as senior coach. Essendon administrator Travis Auld was selected as head of the GC17 board, and would go on to lead the club in an off-field capacity for several years.

The AFL were able to successfully negotiate with the Queensland Government to redevelop Carrara Stadium as the club's new home ground. The announcement of the redevelopment, of which a small portion was funded by the AFL, was made in May 2009. On 22 July 2010 club administrators announced that the club would be known as the Gold Coast Suns, and adopt the colours red, gold and blue.

2009–2010: TAC Cup and VFL
The club's newly assembled junior squad competed in the 2009 TAC Cup under 18 competition and won most of their games, eventually finishing in 5th place. They defeated the Northern Knights in the elimination final but then lost their semi final to the Geelong Falcons. Below is the inaugural vfl as a  team to play for the Gold Coast Football Club, as well as a table of results and fixture for the 2009 and 2010 seasons:

Inaugural TAC Cup team

Source: 2009 TAC Cup Season Results

2010: VFL
In November 2009 the team signed twelve 17-year-olds around the country to compete in the Victorian Football League (VFL) year through the under age access rules. These players included Luke Russell (Burnie), Maverick Weller (Burnie), Taylor Hine (Calder), Josh Toy (Calder), Matt Shaw (Dandenong), Piers Flanagan (Geelong), Hayden Jolly (Glenelg), Alex Keath (Murray), Jack Hutchins (Sandringham), Tom Nicholls (Sandringham), Brandon Matera (South Fremantle), Trent McKenzie (Western Jets).

The Gold Coast was also given permission (by the AFL) to play David Swallow in 2010, despite not being the correct age. The deal that was struck with the AFL stated that Swallow would still need to go through the 2010 AFL Draft to officially join the team, while the other under age recruits contracts would run through 2011.

These are the results and fixture for the 2010 season, in which the club competed in the Victorian Football League (VFL).

Inaugural VFL team

Source: 2010 VFL Season Results

2011: AFL debut
Concessions on entry into the AFL

Players acquired through concessions

Initial 2011 playing squad recruitment

Inaugural AFL team

2011–2014: McKenna era
 
Guy McKenna would continue to coach the team throughout the 2011 season and beyond, after successfully guiding the club through its journey in the TAC Cup and VFL in 2009 and 2010. The Suns would play their first four "home" games of the 2011 AFL season at the Gabba in Brisbane, whilst their home stadium (Metricon Stadium) underwent final redevelopment works.

Gold Coast had a bye in Round 1, and played its first AFL game debuted in Round 2 on 2 April 2011 against Carlton at the Gabba in front of a crowd of 27,914. The first five goals were scored by Carlton, before Charlie Dixon scored the first-ever goal for the Gold Coast Suns. Carlton went on to win by 119 points. Gold Coast won its first game in Round 5 on 23 April 2011, defeating Port Adelaide at AAMI Stadium. Gold Coast trailed by 40 points late in the third quarter, before coming back to win by three points, after Port Adelaide's Justin Westhoff missed a set shot after the siren. Michael Rischitelli was the best on ground. Gold Coast won two more matches for the season, winning the inaugural QClash against  in Round 7 by eight points (which became the most-watched AFL match on pay television ever), and defeating  by 15 points in Round 17 in the first AFL match ever played at Cazaly's Stadium in Cairns. The Suns went on to win the wooden spoon.

Gold Coast endured a poor pre-season in 2012 which included a 13-point loss to fellow AFL newcomers .

The home-and-away season did not begin well for the Suns either, losing their first fourteen matches in succession to be the only winless team after Round 15 of the 2012 AFL season. Their fourteen losses to start the season was the worst by any team since  lost its first 17 matches of the 2001 season. Their horror start to the season ended in round 16 with a narrow 2-point win against Richmond. They had a lead of up to 36 points halfway through the second quarter, which then shrank to 24 points after 2 quick goals before half time from Richmond. Richmond then had a six to two goal quarter, snatching the lead back. The lead then went to 18 points Richmond's way before Gold Coast snatched it back to just 4. With 5 seconds left, a kick from the right forward pocket in Gold Coast's 50 was marked by Karmichael Hunt. After the siren sounded he kicked the goal to make Gold Coast 2-point winners.

The team finished 17th at the end of the season, only above Greater Western Sydney on the AFL ladder. In November 2012 the club announced their "20-ONE-3" plan that targeted signing twenty thousand members and winning a premiership within three years - by the conclusion of the 2015 AFL season. The plan was criticised as being overly ambitious. By the end of the 20-ONE-3 period, the Suns had a highest membership of 13,643 (achieved in 2015) and a highest ladder position of 12 (10 wins - achieved in 2014).

Their improvement on the past two seasons was so stark that they were considered possibilities of securing an unlikely finals berth up until the final round after Essendon lost all their premiership points. The Suns finished with 8 wins for the season and ended the season placed 14th on the ladder. Captain Gary Ablett won his second Brownlow Medal, the first such medalist to win the award at the club.

Despite losing veterans Jared Brennan and Campbell Brown ahead of the 2014 season, some experts predicted Gold Coast to "give the top 8 (finals) a nudge", though the general consensus was that the Suns would likely finish around 13th. Though beginning the season promisingly and entering Round 11 with a 7–2 record following impressive wins on the road against Melbourne, North Melbourne (who had defeated minor premiers  three weeks earlier), and St Kilda, the Suns would stumble severely through the second half of the season. After captain Gary Ablett was injured in a win over Collingwood in round 16, the club went on to lose the next two matches, including one in the QClash against Brisbane. In round 19, the club recorded its inaugural win without their captain, defeating St Kilda. The club went on to lose the remaining matches of the season, finishing in 12th. Inaugural coach Guy McKenna was sacked at season's end, leaving the club after 88 games in charge and winning just over 25% of them.

2015–2017: Rodney Eade
Following McKenna's departure, the Suns announced Rodney Eade as their new coach. Eade had coached the Sydney Swans and Western Bulldogs to multiple finals series and was regarded by some pundits as a good choice to push the Suns into a maiden finals campaign. In his first season, Eade made the decision to rush back Gary Ablett Jr into the side, which led to the on-field targeting of the star midfielder, whilst key position players Charlie Dixon and Harley Bennell were traded to other clubs as the Suns lost their opening four games and never recovered, finishing the 2015 season in 16th place with only four wins. The club started the 2016 season with three consecutive wins and defeated minor premiers , giving the impression it was on the verge of achieving sustained on-field success. However it would only win a further three matches for the season and Ablett was again sidelined with a serious shoulder injury, whilst other players were lost to a combination of injury and suspension. The Suns hit the mid-to-late stage of the following season in reasonable form with a 6–8 win–loss record, though disastrously lost their last eight matches and finished in 15th place. Divisions between some of the players and Eade's cautious game-style emerged and by Round 19 club officials sacked Eade, citing a poor win–loss record. Eade's departure was exacerbated at the end of the season by Ablett's request to be traded back to his original club , despite having another year to serve on his contract with the club.

2018–present: Stuart Dew
The club appointed  and  premiership player Stuart Dew as coach ahead of the 2018 season. Under Dew, the Suns adopted a draft strategy of recruiting young players, which in part contributed to a second-last finish in 2018 and last place finish in 2019, the latter being the club's second wooden spoon. David Swallow was appointed captain in 2019 and emerging talent such as Izak Rankine and Matt Rowell have shown signs of propelling the club to better results in the future, however as of 2022, the club is yet to finish a season higher than 12th place, making them the only team in the modern-day AFL to never reach the finals.

Stadium

Gold Coast began playing at Carrara Stadium in their foundation year of 2009. Although the ground had existed since 1987, the Gold Coast Football Club's establishment in late 2008 prompted the club to use the stadium as their home ground during the 2009 TAC Cup. The ground opened in 1987 and was used by the Brisbane Bears for the first six years of existence and was later used by the North Melbourne Kangaroos and several professional Rugby league teams.

The insufficient and outdated facilities at Carrara Stadium led to the Australian Football League investigating several stadium options for the Gold Coast's inaugural AFL season in 2011. A new $172 million stadium in Helensvale was a strongly considered option. The AFL eventually brokered a deal with the Gold Coast City Council and the Queensland Government to redevelop Carrara Stadium. The $144.2 million upgrade would increase the stadium capacity to 25,000.

Construction for the redevelopment of Carrara Stadium began in December 2009 and the Gold Coast was required to find a new home ground for the 2010 VFL season. The team shared their games among local grounds Fankhauser Reserve, H & A Oval and Cooke-Murphy Oval. The redevelopment ran into the 2011 AFL season and the Gold Coast were again required to find a temporary home ground. The Suns elected to use the Gabba for their first three home games of the 2011 season.

The redeveloped Carrara Stadium (commercially known as Metricon Stadium) was officially opened on 22 May 2011 by Queensland Premier Anna Bligh. Six days later, the Gold Coast Suns hosted their first home match at the redeveloped Carrara Stadium against the Geelong Cats. Two months later, the Suns attracted the largest crowd ever at the Carrara Stadium in a game against Collingwood that attracted an attendance of 23,302, a record was broken in round 16 of 2014 when 24,032 also attended against Collingwood.

The seating capacity was temporarily upgraded to 40,000 as part of the Gold Coast's successful bid to host the 2018 Commonwealth Games.

Whilst the Suns have played most of their home games at Metricon Stadium, there have been several times when the club has played home games away from Carrara. In 2011, the club had to find a temporary home ground as the redevelopment ran into the 2011 AFL season. The Suns elected to use the Gabba for their first three home games of the 2011 season. The Gabba was again used in 2018 AFL season as Carrara was being prepared for the 2018 Commonwealth Games. In that season, they also played a home game in Cairns at Cazaly's Stadium, Perth at Optus Stadium and played the second of their home games in Shanghai at Jiangwan Stadium. This was following the club hosting the first-ever AFL game outside Australia or New Zealand in 2017 in Shanghai.

The club took a home game to their academy zone, Townsville at Riverway Stadium in 2019 before signing a deal with AFL Northern Territory to play a home game in their new academy zone Darwin at TIO Stadium from 2020 to 2024. The match scheduled for Darwin in 2021 was moved however due to COVID-19 and was played as a Suns home game at the Sydney Cricket Ground. In late June, all 18 AFL clubs relocated to Victoria due to various lockdowns due to COVID-19. This resulted in many games being relocated including a Thursday night home game from Metricon Stadium to Marvel Stadium. Brisbane Lions borrowed Metricon stadium for their game against St Kilda Football Club as Greater Brisbane was still considered a red zone under Victorian COVID rules

List of AFL Stadiums

Other home grounds used for the Suns include:
AFL Pre Season: Heritage Bank Stadium (2012-2021), Fankhauser Reserve (2011, 2013, 2018), Riverway Stadium (2015, 2018), Merrimac Oval (2017), Great Barrier Reef Arena (2017, 2019)
AFL Women's: Heritage Bank Stadium (2020-2021), Great Barrier Reef Arena (2020)

Corporate

Membership base and sponsors

Club symbols

Guernseys
The three types of guernseys are:

Home guernsey (worn since 2012): Red and gold based guernsey with the club logo in the middle. Hostplus sponsor on front and Cover-More sponsor on back (home shorts worn in home games and away pants shorts in away games).
Away guernsey (worn since 2019): Blue Jersey Cover-More sponsor on front and Hostplus sponsor on back (away shorts worn).
Clash guernsey (worn since 2016): White based guernsey with an arrow-shaped design which goes down to the bottom, coloured blue, gold and two shades of grey. Cover-More sponsor on front and Hostplus sponsor on back (away shorts worn). No longer worn as of 2019.

Mascot
The Suns' Mascot Manor representative and club mascot is "Sunny Ray". In June 2018 the Suns introduced their new mascot, "Skye".

Song
The team song is "Suns of the Gold Coast Sky".

Home Ground and training and administrative base
The club's primary home ground is Carrara Stadium (known for commercial purposes as "Metricon Stadium"), where they play home matches and train outdoors. The club's indoor training and administrative facilities are located at the adjacent Gold Coast Sports and Leisure Centre.

Rivalries

Brisbane Lions

The Gold Coast Suns have a rivalry with fellow Queensland AFL team the Brisbane Lions. The two teams contest the QClash twice each season. The first QClash was held in 2011, with Gold Coast winning by 8 points; the game established the highest pay TV audience ever for an AFL game, with a total of 354,745 viewers watching the game.

The medal for the player adjudged best on ground is known as the Marcus Ashcroft Medal. It is named after former footballer Marcus Ashcroft, who played junior football on the Gold Coast for Southport and 318 VFL/AFL games for the Brisbane Bears/Lions between 1989 and 2003. He later joined Gold Coast's coaching staff and was the first Queenslander to play 300 VFL/AFL games. Lion Dayne Beams has won the medal three times, the most by any player.

The trophy awarded to the winner of the game is currently known as the "QClash Trophy". The trophy is a "traditional style" looking silver cup with a wooden base and a plaque. The plaque's inscription reads from left to right, "Brisbane Lions AFC", "QCLASH", "Gold Coast Suns FC".

Administration
A three-man committee of former Brisbane Lions chairman Graham Downie, Southport Sharks director Alan Mackenzie and lawyer and community leader John Witheriff established the club's administration. As part of the AFL bid criteria, the GC17 consortium required a commitment from 20,000 locals to become football club members, a $5 million net asset base and 111 sponsors (at least one major, 10 secondary level and 100 tertiary) by mid-October 2008.

Recruitment

In the leadup to the 2009 AFL Draft, the AFL allowed the Gold Coast to recruit 12 players born between January and April 1992, with all other AFL clubs being restricted to players born in 1991 or earlier.

Karmichael Hunt, a professional rugby league footballer with the Brisbane Broncos and rugby union side Biarritz Olympique in France's Top 14, was signed to swap codes to play for the Gold Coast from 2010.

Gary Ablett, Jr., dual premiership player with Geelong and winner of the 2009 Brownlow Medal, signed a deal reportedly worth $9.6 million over five years to captain the Gold Coast during their starting years.

Other significant signings to the current junior team that played in the VFL included Stanis Susuve (a member of Papua New Guinea's International Cup winning team) and Brandon Matera (whose father Wally Matera and uncles Peter and Phil all played senior AFL football with the West Coast Eagles).

At the end of 2010 season, the club had been given the following concessions:
 The ability to sign one uncontracted player from each of the 16 AFL clubs
 Zoned access to five Queensland players prior to the AFL draft
 The first pick in every round plus additional first round picks at Numbers 2, 3, 5, 7, 11, 13 and 15 of the 2010 AFL Draft
 The capacity to pre-list 10 players who had previously nominated for the AFL Draft, or were previously listed with an AFL club
 The first five selections of the Rookie Draft
 An expanded main list of 48 players (clubs are usually allowed 38)

Initial 2011 playing squad recruitment

Current squad

Coaching staff
 Senior coach: 
 Stuart Dew

 Assistant coaches:
 Josh Drummond Defence and Tackling Coach
 Tate Kaesler Team Defence and VFL Coach
 Tim Clarke Forwards and Training Design Coach
 Josh Francou Midfield and Stoppage Structures Coach
 Kurt Tippett Part Time Specialist Coach
 Neil Craig Part Time Coaching Team Consultant

 Head of Development:
 Rhyce Shaw
Click here for more information on Gold Coast's coaching staff

AFL Women's team
In September 2017, Gold Coast were granted a license by the AFL to compete in the AFL Women's league from the start of the 2020 season. The club plays most home games at Carrara Stadium, though has occasionally played at Fankhauser Reserve in nearby Southport, and the Great Barrier Reef Arena in Mackay. The Suns women won only two of their sixteen matches across the 2020 and 2021 seasons. Inaugural coach David Lake left the club at the end of the 2021 season. Lake was replaced by former North Melbourne football manager Cameron Joyce in June 2021.

Squad

Season summaries

^ Denotes the ladder was split into two conferences. Figure refers to the club's overall finishing position in the home-and-away season.

Reserves team

The Gold Coast Suns fielded a reserves team beneath the AFL team in the North East Australian Football League (NEAFL) competition between 2011 and 2019. Following the dissolving of the NEAFL at the end of the 2019 season, the Suns reserves team entered the Victorian Football League (VFL) in 2021.

Season summaries

Honour board

Club records

Club honours

Match and season records
Highest score:  Gold Coast 21.22 (148) v Greater Western Sydney 16.8 (104), Round 5, 2013, StarTrack Oval
Lowest score: Gold Coast 3.2 (20) v Port Adelaide 20.15 (135), Round 23, 2017, Adelaide Oval
Lowest winning score: Gold Coast 7.13 (55) v North Melbourne 5.9 (39), Round 1, 2018, Cazaly's Stadium
Highest losing score: Gold Coast 17.11 (113) v West Coast 20.10 (130), Round 19, 2013, Patersons Stadium
Greatest winning margin: 86 points –  Gold Coast 21.13 (139) v Hawthorn 7.11 (53), Round 3, 2017, Metricon Stadium
Greatest losing margin: 150 points – Gold Coast 6.2 (38) v Geelong 29.14 (188), Round 20, 2011, Kardinia Park
Longest winning streak: 5 (round 5, 2014 – round 10, 2014)
Longest losing streak: 21 (round 18, 2011 – round 15, 2012)
Highest ladder position: 12th, 2014 & 2022
Lowest ladder position: 18th (Wooden Spoon), 2019

AFL finishing positions (2011–present)

Individual awards

All-Australian team
Gary Ablett Jr: 2011 (c), 2012 (vc), 2013 (vc), 2014
Tom Lynch: 2016
Touk Miller: 2021

Leigh Matthews Trophy
Gary Ablett Jr: 2012, 2013

AFLW All-Australian team
Kalinda Howarth: 2020

Brownlow Medal
Gary Ablett Jr: 2013

Ron Evans Medal
Jaeger O'Meara: 2013

Notes

See also

Sport in Australia
Sport in Queensland
Australian Rules Football
Australian rules football in Queensland
History of Australian rules football on the Gold Coast

Books

References

External links

 
 2010 VFL results page at goldcoastfc.com.au

 
Australian Football League clubs
Australian rules football clubs established in 2009
2009 establishments in Australia
Australian rules football clubs in Queensland
Former NAB League clubs
Australian rules football teams on the Gold Coast, Queensland